Wanted Bedspacer is the debut solo album by Filipino musician Ely Buendia, released on December 21, 2000, by BMG Records.

Track listing

Critical reception
Mon Castro of Manila Standard describes Wanted:Bedspacer as a wonderful experimental album. Poch Concepcion of The Philippine Daily Inquirer noted that the album tries to sound different from Eraserheads which may elicit negative reactions among the band's fans. The album's experiments on electronica and studio effects were not warmly met by its audience.

References

2000 debut albums
Alternative rock albums by Filipino artists
Pinoy rock albums